Carmela Bolivár Ríos (born 23 April 1957) is a Peruvian sprinter. She competed in the women's 100 metres at the 1980 Summer Olympics.

References

1957 births
Living people
Athletes (track and field) at the 1975 Pan American Games
Athletes (track and field) at the 1979 Pan American Games
Athletes (track and field) at the 1980 Summer Olympics
Peruvian female sprinters
Olympic athletes of Peru
Place of birth missing (living people)
Pan American Games competitors for Peru
Olympic female sprinters
20th-century Peruvian women